Lex is a surname. Notable people with the surname include:

 Alfred Lex (1913-1944), German Waffen-SS officer in World War II
 Hans Ritter von Lex (1893-1970), German politician and civil servant, and President of the German Red Cross 
 Konrad Lex (born 1974), German ski mountaineer